Edward Alexander Donalds (June 22, 1883 – July 3, 1950), nicknamed "Erston", was a professional baseball pitcher who played in one game for the Cincinnati Reds on September 1, .

External links

1883 births
1950 deaths
Cincinnati Reds players
Major League Baseball pitchers
Baseball players from Ohio
People from Gallia County, Ohio
Lima Cigarmakers players
Portsmouth Cobblers players
Waco Navigators players
Houston Buffaloes players
Evansville Evas players